Lucas Nilsson (born 16 July 1973) is a Swedish former footballer who played as a forward. He made 25 Allsvenskan appearances for Djurgårdens IF and scored four goals.

References

Swedish footballers
Allsvenskan players
Djurgårdens IF Fotboll players
Kalmar FF players
1973 births
Living people
Association football forwards